Real World: Skeletons is the thirtieth season of MTV's reality television series Real World, which focuses on a group of diverse strangers living together for several months in a different city each season, as cameras document their lives and interpersonal relationships. It is the second season of Real World to be filmed in the East North Central States region of the United States, specifically in Chicago, Illinois after The Real World: Chicago.

The season featured a total of seven people with an additional 11 guests who were the "Skeletons". It is the eighth season to take place in a city that had hosted a previous season, as the show's eleventh season was set in Chicago in 2002. Chicago was first reported as the location for the 30th season in a June 2014 article by Crain's Chicago Business. Production began on August 8, 2014, and concluded on October 20, 2014 totaling up to 74 days of filming. The season premiered on December 16 of that year, consisting of 13 episodes.

This season marks the first time that the show has aired on a night other than a Wednesday since the seventeenth season. No reunion special was produced, marking the first time since the tenth season in 2001.

Season changes
Each week, one cast member is faced with people from their past ("skeletons") who they have unresolved issues with at the moment relating to family, romance, work, and socialization. Unlike the previous season, the surprise guests only have the option to live in the house for only one week.

Employment
Beginning in the 28th season, certain jobs in the area were approved by production that the cast had the liberty to apply for independently if desired. This season, the entire cast worked in groups of two or three as bartenders, bar backs, and waiters at three Chicago bars and nightclubs: Vincenzo’s Sports Tavern, Old Fifth, and Red Kiva. Red Kiva was located next door to the cast residence before being demolished in 2019.

The residence
During shooting, the cast lived at 1100 W. Randolph Street in the West Loop neighborhood, the location of Bon V, a former nightclub. The property was demolished in late September 2019 along with the cast's workplace Red Kiva.

Cast
The season started off with seven roommates, and then the cast was joined at different points by eleven additional guests, who each were chosen to visits for a week. The additional guests are Skeletons, people who have unresolved issues with the originals at the moment relating to family, romance, work, and socialization, but they are not officially part of the cast.

 Age at time of filming
 Skeletons in order of arrival

Episodes

After filming
On August 10, 2015, it was announced that Madison and Tony are expecting their first child. On February 16, 2016, Madison and Tony welcomed their daughter, Harper. Nine months after Harper was born, on November 7, 2016, Tony and his former skeleton, Alyssa, welcomed a daughter, Isla, and later got engaged at the Reunion special of The Challenge: Final Reckoning. In July 2018, Madison's parents requested sole custody of Harper. In October of the same year, Madison' parents and Tony agreed to a temporary custody order amid claims that Walls relapsed on drugs use.

In 2017, Walls briefly dated Teen Mom 2 star Javi Marroquin.

Tony and Alyssa appeared on the second season of How Far Is Tattoo Far?

Tony Raines' home was destroyed by Hurricane Ida. His fiancée Alyssa Giacone suffered severe head and hand injuries.

In 2019, Nicole appeared on Game of Clones looking for a Ciara lookalike, and later on the fourth season of Ex on the Beach with exes Laurel Stucky, Ashley Ceasar and Jemmye Carroll. After exiting Ex on the Beach together, Nicole and Ashley appeared on True Life Presents: Quarantine Stories.

Sylvia Elsrode became a real estate agent and appeared on House Hunters.

The Challenge

Challenge in bold indicates that the contestant was a finalist on The Challenge.

References

External links
 Official site. MTV.com
 Real World: Skeletons Trailer. MTV.com

2014 American television seasons
2015 American television seasons
Television shows set in Chicago
Skeletons
Television shows filmed in Illinois